Whatcha Wanna Do? is the second album released by rap group, Partners-N-Crime. It was released on December 23, 1997 for South Coast Music and was produced by Leroy "Precise" Edwards For Precise Recordings. The album peaked at #73 on the Top R&B/Hip-Hop Albums and was the duo's first to make it to the Billboard charts.

Track listing
"What'cha Wanna Do?"- 4:48 
"Pimp'en the Scene"- 3:58 
"Hit Maker's"- 3:28 
"Raw"- 3:42 
"N.O. Block Party"- 6:41 
"Meet Me at the River"- 4:05 (Featuring Ghetto Twiinz)
"Bad M.F."- 3:57 
"Stole the Ye"- 3:38 
"These Are Day'z"- 3:51 
"Finer Thing in Life"- 4:01 
"Down South"- 3:56 
"Get Your Money Right"- 4:17 
"Chopped Down"- 3:42 
"La, La, La"- 3:21

References

1997 albums
Partners-N-Crime albums